Chittagonian may refer to:

 A connection to or inhabitant of Chittagong
 Chittagonian language

See also
 Chittagong (disambiguation)

Language and nationality disambiguation pages